Luminal may refer to:

 A trade name for the anti-epileptic drug phenobarbital
 Luminal (film), a 2004 film by Italian director Andrea Vecchiato starring Denis Lavant
 "Luminal", a 2004 album by Sounds from the Ground
 In biology, pertaining to the lumen, the interior of a hollow structure
 A misspelling of the chemical luminol, commonly used in forensics

See also
 Lumen (disambiguation)